Chrysopoidea is a lacewing superfamily in the suborder Hemerobiiformia.

References

External links 

 
Insect superfamilies